Ray Crawford (October 26, 1915 – February 1, 1996) was an American fighter ace, test pilot, race-car driver and businessman.

Biography

Born in Roswell, New Mexico, Crawford served as a U.S. Army Air Corps fighter pilot and flew the P-38 Lightning in combat over North Africa in 1943. He was tied as the top-ranking fighter ace of the 97th Fighter Squadron with six enemy aircraft confirmed destroyed and one probably destroyed. Rotated home, he eventually became an early jet pilot. At war's end Crawford was evaluating the Lockheed P-80 Shooting Star at Burbank, California and was to have flown the very aircraft that fighter ace Richard Bong was eventually killed in. He was awarded the Distinguished Flying Cross and the Air Medal with fourteen Oak Leaf Clusters before separating from active duty as a Captain in February, 1946. Crawford remained in the Air Force Reserves until April 1953.

Crawford was introduced to racing by Sam Hanks, a former high school classmate, and competed notably with unlimited hydroplanes and automobiles. He drove in the AAA and USAC Championship Car series, racing in the 1954-59 seasons with 9 starts, including the Indianapolis 500 races in 1955-56, and 1959. In 1954, he won the stock-car class of the Carrera Panamericana (a nine-stage, five-day race across Mexico) in a Lincoln. He also finished 7th and 4th in the invitational "Race of Two Worlds" events held at Monza Autodrome, Italy in 1957 and 1958, respectively.

In 1955, Crawford drove a Lincoln-Kurtis sports car at the 12 Hours of Sebring and finished the race in thirteenth position after running the entire length without a co-driver. To date, he is the only driver to have completed the race without relief of any kind.

Crawford's family owned a successful supermarket chain based in El Monte, California which led to his nickname, "The Flying Grocer." Crawford was one of the first owner-drivers of the post-war era at the Indianapolis Motor Speedway and raced his own privately funded cars throughout his career. The only exception came in 1956, when Crawford raced the 12 Hours of Sebring for Chevrolet's inaugural Corvette team. He was also the driver of Corvette's experimental SR-2 at the Bahamas Speedweeks event that December. Cars owned by Crawford also qualified for the Indianapolis 500 with other drivers in 1953, 1954 and 1962.

Serious injuries received during a crash at the 1959 Indianapolis 500 curtailed Crawford's driving career.

Speed legend Mickey Thompson cites Crawford as an early influence in his autobiography, Challenger. Crawford provided Thompson with his first exposure to the Indianapolis 500 as a member of his pit crew.

Crawford died in Los Angeles, California on February 1, 1996 after battling Alzheimer's disease and is buried at Riverside National Cemetery, Riverside California. He is the subject of a 2015 biography by Andrew Layton titled Ray Crawford - Speed Merchant. Dick Wallen, a noted auto racing photographer and publisher, also contributed to the book.

World War II Aerial Victory credits

Awards and decorations
Crawford's ribbons as they appeared upon separation from the armed forces in 1953.
  

From top, and from left to right:

 Row 1: Distinguished Flying Cross, Air Medal, with 14 oak leaf clusters,
 Row 2: Air Medal, continued, American Defense Service Medal, American Campaign Medal,
 Row 3: European-African-Middle Eastern Campaign Medal, World War II Victory Medal, National Defense Service Medal

Indy 500 results

Complete Formula One World Championship results
(key)

References
 Bong, Carl. Dear Mom: So We Have a War. Burgess Publishing, 1993.
 Thompson, Mickey and Griffith Borgeson. Challenger: Mickey Thompson's Own Story of His Life of Speed. Englewood Cliffs, NJ: Prentice-Hall, 1964.

1915 births
1996 deaths
American test pilots
Indianapolis 500 drivers
People from Roswell, New Mexico
Racing drivers from New Mexico
Recipients of the Air Medal
Recipients of the Distinguished Flying Cross (United States)
United States Army Air Forces pilots of World War II
World Sportscar Championship drivers
Military personnel from New Mexico
Carrera Panamericana drivers